Gokuleswor may refer to: 
Gokuleswor, Baitadi
Gokuleswor, Darchula